Border Patrol may refer to:

 Border Patrol (New Zealand TV series), a 2004 New Zealand reality TV programme
 Border Patrol (American TV series), a 1959 syndicated TV series
 The Border Patrol (film), a 1928 film 
 Border Patrol (film), a 1943 Western 
The Shepherd: Border Patrol, a 2008 American action film
 United States Border Patrol, an American federal law enforcement organization

See also

Border Guard (disambiguation)
Border Troops (disambiguation)
Border guard
Border control
Border Force
Border Patrol Police, in Thailand